MTV 90s is an international music television channel from Paramount International Networks that plays music videos from 1990 until 1999. The channel is available in Europe, the Middle East, North Africa, and parts of Southeast Asia (excluding Malaysia). Originally launched as a temporary channel on MTV Classic in the United Kingdom and Ireland from 27 May to 24 June 2016, MTV 90s was launched as a standalone music television channel in Europe, replacing MTV Rocks on 5 October 2020.

History

As a pop-up channel on MTV Classic in the United Kingdom and Ireland (2016)
From 27 May to 24 June 2016, MTV 90s was originally broadcast as a temporary pop-up channel in the United Kingdom and Ireland, which it replaced MTV Classic during that time period. The idents and promos from the pop-up channel would later be reused four years later, when MTV 90s was launched as a standalone channel in Europe on 5 October 2020.

As a dedicated channel (2020-present)
MTV 90s was launched as a dedicated channel in Europe on 5 October 2020 at 05:00 CET, replacing MTV Rocks. The first music video to air on the channel was the song "I Will Always Love You" by Whitney Houston.

On 1 March 2021, MTV 90s expanded its broadcast area to the Middle East and North Africa via the beIN Channels Network pay-TV service.

On 26 May 2021, MTV 90s was launched in the Netherlands, replacing MTV Music 24.

As part of restructuring at Paramount Global UK & Australia, MTV Base was replaced by MTV 90s in the United Kingdom and Ireland from 6 am on 31 March 2022.

As part of restructuring at Paramount Networks EMEAA, MTV 90s was officially launched in the Asia Pacific region replacing MTV Asia on 1 September 2022 at 12:10 AM. Visual updates, such as changing the strip, logo and the program title display, were also made, with the addition of the song's release year being added. Moreover, the programming was altered in that month to adapt to the new changes. MTV 90s was made available in some countries where its sister channel MTV Live already existed.

Format
Since its launch, MTV 90s has been broadcasting in the format of the British music channel Now 90s. Unlike Now 90s (which the channel is broadcast in the United Kingdom), MTV 90s doesn't have any commercial advertising, as the channel is broadcasting from the Czech Republic to the regions of Europe, the Middle East, North Africa, and in parts of Southeast Asia (excluding Hong Kong, where it was replaced by MTV Live and in Malaysia, where it was also replaced by MTV Live but delayed by one hour).

MTV 90s has been broadcasting in 576i 16:9 standard definition since its launch on 5 October 2020. All of the music videos that are airing on MTV 90s have been previously digitized from MTV's archives in Camden Town, London. Like many of the MTV channels in Europe, music videos that were shot and edited in 4:3 aspect ratio are cropped to a 14:9 widescreen aspect ratio, while music videos that were shot and edited in 16:9 aspect ratio (but were shown in a letterboxed aspect ratio when they were originally broadcast) are shown either in its original aspect ratio or in a cropped 14:9 aspect ratio (with some slight letterboxing). However, some music videos may air in either a windowboxed or stretched aspect ratio (for music videos that are in 16:9 widescreen, but letterboxed) or in a cropped 16:9 aspect ratio (for music videos in 4:3).

The on-screen song information graphics (which features the artist, the song title, the album, and the year of the song in a rectangular strap, as well as the old MTV logo on the right side of the strap) that appear during the beginning and the end of each music video are based on the pre-recorded "MTV Strap" titles that were used on MTV Europe from its launch on 1 August 1987 until 1 March 1998 and on MTV Italy from its launch on 1 September 1997 until the beginning of 2001.

Programmes

Regular Programming
 "Ultimate 90s Playlist!"
 "Mmm Bop! Perfect Pop"
 "Saved By The 90s!"
 "Never Forget The 90s!"
 "Alternative Nation!" (alt. name: "Alternative 90s Anthems")
 "90s Mixtape!"
 "Girl Power Hour!"
 "Smells Like... The 90s!"

Thematic Programming

 "YO MTV! 90s Rap & R'n'B" (alt. name: "This is How We Do 90s Hip Hop + RnB")
 "Dance Megamix! 90-99" (alt. name: "90s Dance Anthems")
 "Boys Vs Girls: 90s Hits Battle!"
 "The Power Of 90s Love!" (alt. name: "Truly, Madly, Deeply... 90s Love!" or "90s in Love!")
 "2 For 1: 90s Double Drop!"
 "MTV 90s @ the Movies!"
 "Non-Stop 90s Europop!"
 "Saturday Night Party!"
 "Smells Like... the 90s!"
 "USA Hitlist! 90-99"

Top 50

 Best First Hits of the 90s!
 Biggest Albums of the 90s!
 Videos That Defined the 90s!
 Top Hits Of 1990!
 Top Hits Of 1991!
 Top Hits Of 1992!
 Top Hits Of 1993!
 Top Hits Of 1994!
 Top Hits Of 1995!
 Top Hits Of 1996!
 Top Hits Of 1997!
 Top Hits Of 1998!
 Top Hits Of 1999!
 90s Alternative Anthems!
 90s @ The Movies!
 Sing It Back 90s Karaoke Classics!
 Encore Fois: 90s Eurodance Hits!
 90s Rocks (alt. name: 90s Rocks Anthems!)
 All For Love! Top 50
 Club Classics!
 Come As You Are! Alt-Rock
 It's Like That! 90s Rap Party 50
 90s Power Ballads!
 Don't Speak! 50 Heartbreak Hits Of the 90s
 50 Girls Who Ruled The 90s!

Special
 Coolio: A Tribute
 De La Soul's David Jolicoeur: A Tribute

Seasonal Programming

Valentine's Day
 90s In Love!

International Women's Day
 Ultimate 90s Wonder Women!
 90s Wonder Women: Double Shots!
 Viva Forever! Non-Stop 90s Girl Group Top 20
 Up Front: 90s Alt-Rock Superwomen! (March 8, 2022)

Europe Day
 Rhythm Of the Night! 90s Euro Party!

International Men's Day
 Never Forget The 90s Boys!

New Year's Eve/New Year's Day
 "It's A 90s New Year's Party!"
 "Happy New Year from MTV 90s!"

Other

July 2022
Videos
 "Bigger Than Big! Epic 90s Videos"

Former Programmes
 "90s Biggest Ballads!"
 "Ain`t No Party like a 90s Party!"
 "MTV 90s Top 50"
 "This Is How We Do A 90s Houseparty!"
 "It Takes Two: 90s Duets!"
 "MTV's Sounds Of ....!" (1990–1999)
 Top 40
 90s Alternative Anthems!
 90s At The Movies!
 90s Worldwide №.1s!
 Top 50
 90s Boys Vs Girls!
 90s Dance Classics!
 90s Girls!
 90s Hip Hop & R'N'B!
 90s Pop Hits!
 I Like to Move It 90s Party!
 1990-1994: Back 2 the Hits!
 1995-1999: Back 2 the Hits!!
 Biggest Voices of the 90s!
 Boybands Vs Girlbands!
 Heartbreak Hits of the 90s!
 Ultimate 50 Female Artists of the 90s!
 Girl-Power Hits!
 1990 vs. 1995!
 1992 vs. 1997!
 1993 vs. 1998!
 1994 vs. 1999!
 The Story Of The 90s... In 50 Vids
 MTV VMA: Champions of the 90s!
 It's the 90s And I'm Feeling Good!
 90s Boys vs. Girls Rock!
 90s Boyband Hits!
 Hot 90s Hits From the Boys!
 Legends That Made The 90s!
 RnB Stars: 50 Top Hits!
 Mmm Bop 50 Pop Stars Of The 90s!

Notes
 MTV 90S PREMIERE IN OCTOBER AT WIND VISION'S STRONG MUSIC PORTFOLIO… (in Greek)

References

MTV channels
Television channels and stations established in 2020
Television channels in the Netherlands
Television channels in North Macedonia
Television stations in Malta
Classic television networks